Tura Government College, established in 1958, is a general degree college situated in Tura, Meghalaya. This college is affiliated with the North Eastern Hill University.

Departments

Science
Physics
Mathematics
Chemistry
Botany
Zoology

Arts and Commerce
Garo
English
History
Education
Economics
Philosophy
Political Science
Commerce

References

External links

Universities and colleges in Meghalaya
Colleges affiliated to North-Eastern Hill University
Educational institutions established in 1958
1958 establishments in Assam